The 2015–16 Burkinabé Premier League is the 54th edition of top flight football in Burkina Faso. A total of sixteen teams contested in the season which began on 20 November.

Teams

 AJEB
 ASF Bobo Dioulasso
 ASFA
 Bankuy Sports
 Comoé
 Étoile Filante
 Kadiogo
 Koudougou
 KOZAF
 Majestic
 Ouagadougou
 RC Bobo Dioulasso
 Santos FC
 SONABEL
 USFA
 Yatenga

League table

References

External links
Soccerway

Premier League
Premier League
Burkina Faso
Burkinabé Premier League seasons